Defiance Records was a record label based in Cologne, Germany, which was the German and European distributor of several American and international post-hardcore and punk bands. The label was founded in 1994 and closed down in 2013.

Artists

List of artists that signed with Defiance Records

 Alesana
 Alexisonfire
 Ambrose
 As Friends Rust
 The Cable Car Theory
 Clarity Process
 The Coalfield
 The Copperpot Journals
 The Data Break
 Delorean
 Down In Frustration
 Engrave
 Face the Enemy
 Gameface
 Hot Water Music
 Haste
 Hopeful
 It's Not Not
 Joshua
 Jude the Obscure
 Kevin Devine
 Limbeck
 Miracle of 86
 The National Anthems
 Never Surrender
 New End Original
 One Man and His Droid
 Pale
 Portugal. The Man
 Piebald
 Reno Kid
 River City High
 Solea
 Standstill
 The Stereo
 Three Minute Poetry
 Wedekind

Discography
1999: Pale Another Smart Move (with Soda Records)
2001: Pale Razzmatazz (The Arts at the Sands)
2002: Pale How to Survive Chance

See also 
 List of record labels

References

External links
 Official site

German independent record labels
Alternative rock record labels
Hardcore record labels